Call signs in New Zealand are no longer generally used to identify broadcast stations. However, New Zealand's radio stations were once known by their call signs and would usually broadcast their call signs as a number followed by X, Y, or Z, and another letter (e.g. 1YA). Call signs are regulated internationally by the ITU and nationally by the Ministry of Business, Innovation and Employment (MBIE), formerly the Ministry of Economic Development.  The ministry is also responsible for providing policy advice to Government on the allocation of New Zealand's radio spectrum to support, efficient, reliable and responsive wireless telecommunications and broadcasting infrastructure.

In 1924, New Zealand was granted the prefix 'Z', and in 1925 the number of licensed amateur reached 100. In 1927, the International Telecommunication Union Conference in Washington (D.C., USA) established internally agreed upon call sign prefixes – New Zealand was assigned 'OZ'.  In 1929 this was expanded to the ZK–ZM letter block, with New Zealand opting for the ZL prefix for land based stations.  'OZ' by 1927 was reassigned to Denmark. In 1969 the ZM prefix was allowed to celebrate the Captain James Cook bicentenary.  In 1974 the prefix was allowed again to celebrate the Commonwealth Games, as well as in 1989 when the Games returned. In 1981 the ZL0 prefix was allowed for visitors to New Zealand.

Allocations and assignments

The International Telecommunication Union has assigned New Zealand the following call sign blocks for all radio communication, broadcasting or transmission:

While not directly related to call signs, the International Telecommunication Union (ITU) further has divided all countries assigned amateur radio prefixes into three regions; New Zealand is located in ITU Region 3, within ITU Zone 60.

There are 4 possible 2-letter prefixes and 40 2-letter/1-number prefixes available to New Zealand operators based on the ITU blocks (ZK, ZL, ZM and E5).  This provides for about 720,000 three-character-suffix call signs and significantly more if numerals comprise either or both of the first two characters of the suffix.  A further 18.8 million 4-character call signs are potentially available, as well as considerably more when digits are assigned in the suffix.

Of these prefixes, 1 is currently assigned (ZL) for normal amateur radio operation.  ZM can be used in place of ZL for short special events (e.g. contests), and E5 calls are issued in the Cook Islands (both North and South Cooks).

Although ZL1 to ZL4 were previously issued strictly according to the operator's location within New Zealand, that is no longer the case.

New Zealand is assigned DXCC entity #170.  Primary callsign suffixes can be from to four letters in the A–Y, AA–YZ, AAA–YZZ and AAAA–YZZZ blocks. Temporary special event callsigns may have five or six letter suffixes.

Use of 'ZM'
The ZM prefix can be substituted for ZL for contests and commemorative events, at the discretion of the licensee.

Single-letter callsigns
ZL licence holders may apply for up to one secondary single-letter callsign, such as ZL1W. A "stand-down" period of six months applies in regard to the reallocation of temporary callsigns to the same licence holder or club. However, the callsign may be reallocated for further 12-month periods without stand-down, provided the licence authority receives at the time of the application (which must be made prior to the expiry of the then current 12-month period) evidence to the licensing authority's satisfaction that a temporary callsign is being used on a regular basis.

Two-numeral callsigns
The E5 prefix for the Cook Islands produces two-numeral callsigns when the separating numeral is attached.  The 'E51' prefix is most often used.

Five and six letter callsigns
Temporary callsigns may be issued with up to 6 letter suffixes, such as ZL1ABCDEF. Such callsigns may be allocated for up to 12 months, typically for special events and notable anniversaries.

Allocation of temporary callsigns in the ZL10 to ZL100 Series
A licence holder with a primary or secondary callsign in the ZL1 to ZL9
series may be allocated, as a temporary callsign for a period not exceeding 3 months, a
ZL10 to ZL100 prefix to commemorate their anniversary as an active amateur (or the
establishment of the club). For example, the holder of ZL1WZZ celebrating 40 years in
amateur radio may be allocated, for a 3-month period, the callsign ZL40WZZ.

Nomenclature 

All radio stations call signs started with ZL, although this was excluded when broadcast.

The number referred to the geographical area:

The first letter referred to the type of station:

For private stations, beginning with X, the final letter in the call sign was usually the first letter of the name of the station or the name of the town the station was based in or simply a letter chosen by the station.

For non-commercial stations beginning with the letter Y, the four main centres (Auckland, Wellington, Christchurch and Dunedin) had YA stations, the second largest centre at the time was typically assigned a YZ station such as 3YZ in Greymouth and 4YZ in Southland, this was for National Radio.  For other regions the final letter was typically the first letter the location. The Concert Programme in the 4 main centres was assigned YC and at this stage only broadcast in the main centres however the Concert Programme was relayed onto other stations during evenings.

The last letter was either the first letter of the location, (e.g. 1ZH in Hamilton and 4ZG in Gore) or was assigned in order with ZB going to the 4 main centres (Auckland, Wellington, Christchurch and Dunedin) and ZA going to the second largest region at the time such as 1ZA Taupo, 2ZA Palmerston North, 3ZA Greymouth and 4ZA Invercargill.

This system of allocating call signs was for AM radio stations only, the very few FM radio stations that were operating had 3 letters in the call sign, the first number remained the same. Radio stations that were originally on AM but began broadcasting on FM often kept the AM call sign name or an additional letter was added to the existing call sign name. Some examples are 2ZM in Wellington became 2ZZM (but at this point branded as ZMFM) and 1XX in Whakatane became 1XXX but remained branded as One Double X. Call signs for these stations were often an abbreviation of the stations brand name. The FM call signs assigned to Concert FM usually followed the format of the area number, the first letter of the city or region and then the letters CP (Concert Programme), for example 1ACP in Auckland and 4DCP in Dunedin. National Radio was not broadcasting on FM when stations were allocated call signs so no call signs were ever allocated to National Radio's FM frequencies.

List of call signs
The following is a list of some of the call signs assigned to radio stations prior to 1990 when New Zealand stopped assigning call signs to radio stations.

Region 1

AM stations
Radio stations that originally broadcast on an AM frequency.

FM stations
Stations that originally broadcast on an FM frequency or existing stations that were assigned a new call sign after beginning broadcasting on FM.

Region 2

AM stations
Radio stations that originally broadcast on an AM frequency.

FM stations
Stations that originally broadcast on an FM frequency or existing stations that were assigned a new call sign after beginning broadcasting on FM.

Region 3

AM stations
Radio stations that originally broadcast on an AM frequency.

FM stations
Stations that originally broadcast on an FM frequency or existing stations that were assigned a new call sign after beginning broadcasting on FM.

Region 4

AM stations
Radio stations that originally broadcast on an AM frequency.

FM stations
Stations that originally broadcast on an FM frequency or existing stations that were assigned a new call sign after beginning broadcasting on FM.

Maritime Radio

Coastal radio stations operated by the New Zealand Post Office to serve shipping traffic were allocated callsigns consisting of the ZL prefix and a single letter. The only remaining coastal station as of 2018 is Taupo Maritime Radio ZLM, operated by Kordia on behalf of Maritime New Zealand.

See also 
 List of radio stations in New Zealand
 Amateur radio call signs of New Zealand
 Amateur radio international operation
 ITU prefix – amateur and experimental stations
 Amateur radio

References

External links
 Radio Spectrum Management group (RSM)
 Radio Amateurs of New Zealand

New Zealand
Communications in New Zealand
Mass media in New Zealand